Juan Marín may refer to:
 Juan Marin (judoka) (born 1952), Puerto Rican judoka
 Juan Marín (Spanish politician) (born 1962)
 Juan Alvarado Marín (born 1948), Mexican footballer
 Juan Antonio Marín (born 1975), Costa Rican tennis player
 Juan Rodolfo Marín (1909–1967), Chilean journalist and politician

See also
Juan Marén (born 1971), Cuban wrestler